The 3rd Armored Infantry Regiment is an inactive armored infantry regiment of the Italian Army based in Persano in Campania. Originally the regiment, like all Italian tank units, was part of the infantry, but on 1 June 1999 it became part of the cavalry. Operationally the regiment was last assigned to the Infantry Division "Granatieri di Sardegna".

History

Formation 
The regiment traces its history back to the Armed Tanks Regiment formed on 1 October 1927 in Rome, which moved in 1931 to Bologna. The regiment was disbanded on 15 September 1936 and in its stead four tank infantry regiments were raised:

 1st Tank Infantry Regiment, in Vercelli
 2nd Tank Infantry Regiment, in Verona
 3rd Tank Infantry Regiment, in Bologna
 4th Tank Infantry Regiment, in Rome

The 3rd Tank Infantry Regiment retrained three battalions: VI and VII assault tanks battalions and the I Breach Tank Battalion. The assault tanks battalions fielded L3/35 tankettes, while the breach tanks battalion fielded Fiat 3000 light tanks. The regiment also controlled the Mechanized Company "Zara" in Zadar, which fielded a mix of Lancia 1ZM armored cars and L3/35 tankettes. The regiment was the central training center for all officers and ranks destined for tank units and fielded three separate training battalions. Additionally the regiment was administratively and logistically responsible for all tank units deployed in the Italian colonies of: Libya, Eritrea, and Somaliland. The regiment's initial structure was:

 3rd Tank Infantry Regiment, in Bologna
 VI Assault Tanks Battalion "Lollini", in Treviso (L3/35 tankettes)
 VII Assault Tanks Battalion "Vezzani", in Florence (L3/35 tankettes)
 I Breach Tanks Battalion, in Bologna (Fiat 3000 light tanks)
 Tank Officers Training Battalion, in Bologna
 Tank Non-Commissioned Officers Training Battalion, in Bologna
 Tank Specialists Training Battalion, in Bologna
 Mechanized Company "Zara", in Zadar (Fiat 3000 light tanks and Lancia 1ZM armored cars)
 3rd Tank Training Center, in Bologna
 3rd Tank Materiel Maintenance Workshop, in Bologna

In 1936 the regiment received the XXIII Assault Tanks Battalion "Stennio", and XXXII Assault Tanks Battalion "Battisti" after their return from Libya. On 15 July 1937 the regiment ceded the I Breach Tanks Battalion for the formation of the 31st Tank Infantry Regiment, while on 6 January 1939 the regiment ceded the VI Assault Tanks Battalion "Lollini", XXIII Assault Tanks Battalion "Stennio" and XXXII Assault Tanks Battalion "Battisti" to the forming 33rd Tank Infantry Regiment. During 1939 the regiment received the V Assault Tanks Battalion "Venezian" from the 32nd Tank Infantry Regiment, and ceded the VII Assault Tanks Battalion "Vezzani" to the 31st Tank Infantry Regiment. In April 1940 tank battalions were renamed and so the regiment entered World War II with the following structure:

 3rd Tank Infantry Regiment, in Bologna
 V Tank Battalion "L" (L3/35 tankettes)
 Tank Officers Training Battalion, in Bologna
 Tank Non-Commissioned Officers Training Battalion, in Bologna
 Tank Specialists Training Battalion, in Bologna
 Mechanized Company "Zara", in Zadar (Fiat 3000 light tanks and Lancia 1ZM armored cars)
 3rd Tank Training Center, in Bologna
 3rd Tank Materiel Maintenance Workshop, in Bologna

World War II 
During December 1940 the V Tank Battalion "L" was sent to North Africa, where it joined the 17th Infantry Division "Pavia" for the Western Desert Campaign. For its conduct during Operation Crusader the V battalion was awarded a Bronze Medal of Military Valour. During the war the regiment trained all personnel destined for tank units and managed the training grounds at Bologna, Porretta, Riolo, Vergato, Asiago, and Futa. The regiment was also the central research and test center of the army's armored vehicles. In spring 1941 the regiment raised the IX Tank Battalion "M" with M13/40 tanks, which arrived on 29 July 1941 in Libya and joined the 32nd Tank Infantry Regiment. As with the V Tank Battalion "L" before, also the IX distinguished itself during the Western Desert Campaign and was awarded a Bronze Medal of Military Valour. After Italy changed sides with the Armistice of Cassibile on 8 September 1943 the 3rd Tank Infantry Regiment was disbanded by the Germans.

Cold War 
During 1963 the regiment was raised again as 3rd Armored Infantry Regiment in Persano in Southern Italy and joined the Infantry Division "Granatieri di Sardegna". Besides being the armored component of the "Granatieri di Sardegna" division the regiment was also the training unit of the Mechanized and Armored Troops School in Caserta. Therefore the regiment, unlike the other three armored infantry regiments of the army, fielded its own reconnaissance squadron and was assigned a self-propelled artillery battery.

  3rd Armored Infantry Regiment, in Persano (detached to the Mechanized and Armored Troops School)
 Command and Services Company, in Persano (includes an anti-tank guided missile platoon)
 IV Bersaglieri Battalion, in Persano (M113 armored personnel carriers)
 IX Tank Battalion, in Salerno (M47 Patton tanks)
 Squadron "Cavalleggeri di Alessandria", in Persano
 7th Battery, in Persano (M7 105mm self-propelled howitzers, detached from the III Self-propelled Field Artillery Group, 13th Field Artillery Regiment)

9th Armored Battalion "M.O. Butera" 
During the 1975 army reform the 3rd Armored Infantry Regiment was disbanded on 1 October 1975 and its IV Bersaglieri Battalion became the 67th Bersaglieri Battalion "Fagare", while the IX Tank Battalion was disbanded. On the same day the IV Mechanized Battalion of the 17th Infantry Regiment "Acqui" based in L'Aquila was renamed 9th Armored Battalion "M.O. Butera" and received the flag and traditions of the disbanded 3rd Armored Infantry Regiment. The battalion's number commemorated the IX Tank Battalion "M", which the 3rd regiment had raised and which had distinguished itself during the Western Desert Campaign. Tank and armored battalions created during the 1975 army reform were all named for officers, soldiers and partisans, who were posthumously awarded Italy's highest military honor the Gold Medal of Military Valour during World War II. The 9th Armored Battalion's name commemorated 4th Tank Infantry Regiment Soldier Gaetano Butera, who had joined a partisan unit in Rome and was murdered on 24 March 1944 in the Ardeatine massacre. Equipped with M47 Patton tanks and M113 armored personnel carriers the battalion joined the Motorized Brigade "Acqui".

On 1 October 1991 the 9th "Butera" left the brigade and moved to Monte Romano, where the unit took over management of the Monte Romano Training Range. With the end of the Cold War the Italian Army drew down its forces and on 29 September 1995 the battalion was disbanded and the flag of the 3rd Armored Infantry Regiment transferred to the Shrine of the Flags in the Vittoriano in Rome.

See also 
 Motorized Brigade "Acqui"

References

Tank Regiments of Italy
1936 establishments in Italy